Francis Phillip Wuppermann (June 1, 1890 – September 18, 1949), known professionally as Frank Morgan, was an American character actor. He was best known for his appearances in films starting in the silent era in 1916, and then numerous sound films throughout the 1930s and 1940s, with a career spanning 35 years mostly as a contract player at Metro-Goldwyn-Mayer, with his most celebrated performance playing the title role in The Wizard of Oz (1939). He was also briefly billed early in his career as Frank Wupperman and Francis Morgan.

Early life
Morgan was born on June 1, 1890, in New York City, to Josephine Wright (née Hancox) and George Diogracia Wuppermann. He was the youngest of 11 children and had five brothers and five sisters. The elder Mr. Wuppermann was born in Venezuela but was brought up in Hamburg, Germany, and was of German and Spanish ancestry. His mother was born in the United States, of English ancestry. His brother Ralph Morgan was also an actor of stage and screen. The family earned their wealth distributing Angostura bitters, allowing Wuppermann to attend Cornell University, where he was a member of the Phi Kappa Psi fraternity and the Glee Club.

Career

Film

Morgan starred with John Barrymore in Raffles, the Amateur Cracksman (1917), an independent film produced in and about New York City. His career expanded when talkies began. Although the befuddled but good-hearted middle-aged man became his stereotypical role, he played romantic leads in such films as When Ladies Meet (1933) and Enchanted April (1935). By the mid-1930s, Metro-Goldwyn-Mayer was so impressed by Morgan that they signed him to a lifetime contract.  In 1936 Morgan played alongside Shirley Temple as Professor Appleby in Dimples. 

Morgan is best remembered for his performance in The Wizard of Oz (1939), in which picture he played a total of six roles, most notably the Wizard, which included the carnival huckster "Professor Marvel", the gatekeeper at the Emerald City, the coachman of the carriage drawn by "The Horse of a Different Color", the Emerald City guard (who initially refuses to let Dorothy and her friends in to see the Wizard), and the Wizard's scary face projection. Morgan was cast in the role on September 22, 1938. W. C. Fields was originally chosen for the part of the Wizard, but the studio ran out of patience after protracted haggling over his fee. 

An actor with a wide range, Morgan was equally effective playing comical, befuddled men such as Jesse Kiffmeyer in Saratoga (1937) and Mr. Ferris in Casanova Brown (1944), as he was with more serious, troubled characters like Hugo Matuschek in The Shop Around the Corner (1940), Professor Roth in The Mortal Storm (1940) and Willie Grogan in The Human Comedy (1943). MGM's musical comedy film The Great Morgan (1946), is a compilation film featuring Frank Morgan supposedly as himself but playing the familiar bumbler.  Occasionally a co-star (as in The Human Comedy, and, once established, invariably a featured player), he also saw the occasional lead deep in his Hollywood career, as the philanthropic tycoon falsely accused of murder in 1941's Washington Melodrama and The Great Morgan (in which he is the Morgan of the title, the picture's central player).

During the 1940s Morgan appeared in such diverse genres and roles as an oil wildcatter in Boom Town (supporting Clark Gable, Spencer Tracy, and Claudette Colbert); Tortilla Flat in 1942 (based on the John Steinbeck book, again supporting Tracy); a jungle doctor in White Cargo (supporting Walter Pidgeon and Hedy Lamarr); a shepherd in the Courage of Lassie in 1946; a doctor again in Green Dolphin Street in 1948 in support of Lana Turner, Van Heflin, and Donna Reed; King Louis XIII in The Three Musketeers in 1948, supporting Gene Kelly and Turner again; and as Jimmy Stewart’s boss in The Stratton Story in 1949. He played a fire chief in his final picture, Key to the City, filmed in 1949 but released posthumously in 1950.

Radio
Morgan also had a career in radio.  In the 1940s, Morgan co-starred with Fanny Brice in one version (of several different series) of the radio program Maxwell House Coffee Time, aka The Frank Morgan-Fanny Brice Show. During the first half of the show Morgan would tell increasingly outlandish tall tales about his life adventures, much to the dismay of his fellow cast members. After the Morgan segment there was a song, followed by Brice as 'Baby Snooks' for the last half of the show. When Brice left to star in her own program in 1944, Morgan continued solo for a year with The Frank Morgan Show. In 1947, Morgan starred as the title character in the radio series The Fabulous Dr. Tweedy. He also recorded a number of children's records, including the popular Gossamer Wump, released in 1949 by Capitol Records.

Personal life and death
Morgan married Alma Muller in 1914; they had one son, George. They were married until Frank's death in 1949. Morgan was widely known to be an alcoholic, according to several people who worked with him, including Margaret Hamilton and Aljean Harmetz. Morgan sometimes carried a black briefcase to work, fully equipped with a small mini-bar.

Morgan's niece Claudia Morgan (née Wuppermann) was a stage and film actress, and his brother was playwright Carlos Wuppermann.

Morgan died of a heart attack on September 18, 1949, shortly after filming of Annie Get Your Gun had begun. He was replaced in the role of Buffalo Bill by Louis Calhern.  Morgan is buried in Green-Wood Cemetery in Brooklyn. His tombstone carries his real name, Wuppermann, as well as his stage name.

Awards and honors
Morgan was nominated for two Academy Awards, one for Best Actor in The Affairs of Cellini (1934) and one for Best Supporting Actor in Tortilla Flat (1942). He has two stars dedicated to him on the Hollywood Walk of Fame in Hollywood, California: one for his films at 1708 Vine Street and one for his work in radio at 6700 Hollywood Boulevard. Both were dedicated on February 8, 1960.

Filmography

Radio appearances

See also
 
 
 
 List of actors with Academy Award nominations

References

Further reading

External links

 
 
 

1890 births
1949 deaths
20th-century American male actors
20th-century American male singers
20th-century American singers
American male film actors
American male musical theatre actors
American male silent film actors
American male stage actors
American people of English descent
American people of German descent
American people of Spanish descent
Burials at Green-Wood Cemetery
Cornell University alumni
Male actors from New York City
Metro-Goldwyn-Mayer contract players
Members of The Lambs Club